Abacetus longulus is a species of ground beetle in the subfamily Pterostichinae. It was described by Tschitscherine in 1900.

References

longulus
Beetles described in 1900